The 2020 NCAA Division I women's soccer season was the 38th season of NCAA championship women's college soccer. The season was originally slated to begin on August 20, 2020 and conclude on November 9, 2020. The season was to culminate with the 2020 NCAA Division I Women's Soccer Tournament, which was to be held from November 18 to December 13, 2020, with the four-team College Cup.

On August 13, 2020, the NCAA Tournament, along with all fall sport tournaments, was suspended due to the ongoing COVID-19 pandemic. Leading up to the postseason tournament suspension, some conferences had planned to play conference-only matches during the fall season, while some conferences opted to postpone the season to Spring 2021 (February to May 2021). Ultimately, the Atlantic Coast Conference, Big 12 Conference, Southeastern Conference, and the Sun Belt Conference began play for the 2020 fall season; while a handful of programs scheduled competitive fixtures for the fall 2020 season: Navy, Mercer, Middle Tennessee, and UAB.

On September 16, 2020 the NCAA announced that the spring season would run from February 3 to April 17, 2021, culminating with the NCAA Tournament, which was reduced from 64 to 48 teams for this season only. The postponed NCAA Tournament began on April 30 and ended on May 17, 2021. The ACC, Big 12, SEC, and Sun Belt champions, who will be determined in November, will earn automatic bids into the tournament. Nevertheless, the season began on September 10, 2020, with Appalachian State hosting Pitt, with Pitt winning the match 4–0.

Preseason

Coaching changes

New programs 
On November 27, 2017, it was announced that, in 2020, the Tritons of the University of California, San Diego, located in the San Diego, California district of La Jolla, would begin the transition from Division II to Division I as a member of the Big West Conference.

On January 11, 2019, it was announced that the Trailblazers of Dixie State University of St. George, Utah would begin the transition from Division II to Division I as a member of the Western Athletic Conference (WAC).

On June 17, 2019, it was announced that the Knights of Bellarmine University of Louisville, Kentucky would begin the transition from Division II to Division I as a member of the ASUN Conference.

On July 15, 2020, after months of consideration, the NCAA granted the highly unusual request of the University of St. Thomas to move directly from Division III to Division I. The school had already accepted an invitation to join the Summit League, and the Tommies will enter Division I and Summit League competition in 2021.

Conference realignment

Impact of COVID-19 on season 

For the 2020 season, several changes in how the season began, and how conference play was organized affected the 2020 season.

 The Atlantic 10 Women's Soccer Tournament, for the 2020 season only, was reduced from eight teams to four, to minimize travel and contamination.
 The Big East Conference divided into two divisions, the "East" and "Midwest" divisions to minimize travel and to regionalize conference play.
 The Big South Conference Women's Soccer Tournament, for the 2020 season only, will be reduced from six teams to four, to minimize travel and contamination.
 The Mid-American Conference discontinued its women's soccer tournament.
 The Southern Conference Women's Soccer Tournament, for the 2020 season only, will be reduced from six teams to four, to minimize travel and contamination.
 On July 8, the Ivy League cancelled all intercollegiate sports for the 2020 Fall semester; this includes both men's and women's soccer.
 On July 10, the Big Ten and Pac-12 Conferences announced all teams would play the 2020 season with conference-only matches
 On July 13, the Patriot League announced that all fall sports, including women's soccer would be cancelled.
 On July 17, the Atlantic 10 Conference announced that all fall sports, including women's soccer, would be postponed to spring 2021.
 On August 13, the Western Athletic Conference  announced that all fall sports, including women's soccer, would be postponed to spring 2021. However, the league is allowing nonconference games.	
 On August 13, the Southern Conference  announced that conference competition in all fall sports, including women's soccer, would be suspended through the end of the calendar year.
 On August 14, the ASUN Conference  announced that all fall sports, including women's soccer, would be postponed with the intent to hold them in spring 2021.
 On August 15, the NCAA suspended the women's soccer championship for the fall season, with the possibility of being played in winter or spring 2021
 On August 27, four conferences confirmed to play in the fall, with individual programs allowed to play games in the fall. The ACC, Big 12, SEC, and the Sun Belt will play in fall 2020. The other conferences will play in spring 2021.

Fall 2020 season

Standings

Rankings

Honors

Major upsets

Spring 2021 season

Standings

Rankings

Honors

Major upsets

Statistics

Individual statistics 
Source: NCAA.com

 Individual statistics are through the games of September 28, 2020

See also 
 College soccer
 Impact of the COVID-19 pandemic on association football
 List of NCAA Division I women's soccer programs
 2020 in American soccer
 2020 NCAA Division I Women's Soccer Tournament
 2020 NCAA Division I men's soccer season

References 

 
NCAA Division I Women